is a Japanese actor and voice actor affiliated with the Seinenza Theater Company. Hiura is known for dubbing over Bruce Willis, Richard Dreyfuss, John Malkovich, Joe Pesci and many more.

Filmography

Films
Goyokin (1969) – Rokuzo
Fuji sanchō (1970) – A Man
Mount Hakkoda (1977) – Sato
Eijanaika (1981)
The Ballad of Narayama (1983)
Tōki Rakujitsu (1992)
Zatōichi (2003)
Ryuzo and The Seven Henchmen (2015) – Ichizō
Crazy Samurai Musashi (2020)

Television drama
Ultraman (1966) – A Truck driver
Tokugawa Ieyasu (1983) – Hattori Hanzō
Sanga Moyu (1984)
Edo o Kiru (1994)
Shinsengumi Keppūroku (1998)
Kamen Rider Hibiki (2005)
Kamen Rider W (2010)
Sanada Maru (2016) – Ōsumi Yozaemon

Television animation
Lupin III Part II (1979) – Gabotto, Bakki
Master Keaton (1999) – Kendoru
Golgo 13 (2009) – Roy
Gosick (2011) – Kazuya's father
Danchi Tomoo (2013) – Kimifumi Hazama
Your Lie in April (2014) – Junzō Ibata
Ace Attorney (2016) - Judge
One Piece (2017) - Zunisha

OVA
Submarine 707R (2003) – Captain Yōhei Hayami

Video games
Kingdom Hearts II (2005) – Banzai
Project X Zone (2012) – Bruno Delinger
Resident Evil: Revelations 2 (2015) – Evgeny Rebic
 Famicom Detective Club: The Girl Who Stands Behind (2021 Remake) (2021) - Zenzou Tanabe

Dubbing roles

Live-action
Bruce Willis
Die Hard – John McClane
Die Hard 2 – John McClane
Hudson Hawk – Eddie 'Hudson Hawk' Hawkins
The Last Boy Scout – Joe Cornelius Hallenbeck
Death Becomes Her (1996 NTV edition) – Dr. Ernest Menville
Nobody's Fool – Carl Roebuck
North – Narrator, Easter Bunny, Gabby
12 Monkeys – James Cole
Die Hard with a Vengeance – John McClane
The Making of 'Die Hard: With a Vengeance' (TV Short 1995) – Himself
Four Rooms – Leo
Television and Radio Advertisement of Georgia – Himself
Bandits – Joe Blake
Hart's War – Colonel William A. McNamara
Hostage (2009 TV Asahi edition) – Police Chief Jeff Talley
Sin City – Det. John Hartigan
Live Free or Die Hard – John McClane
Catch .44 – Mel
A Good Day to Die Hard (2015 Collector's Box edition) – John McClane
The Prince – Omar
Sin City: A Dame to Kill For – John Hartigan
Extraction – Leonard Turner
Precious Cargo – Eddie Pilosa
Reprisal – James
Breach – Clay Young
Deadlock - Ron Whitlock
A Day to Die - Alston
Wire Room - Shane Mueller
Richard Dreyfuss
Jaws (1981 NTV edition) – Matt Hooper
Close Encounters of the Third Kind (1982 TV Asahi edition) – Roy Neary
The Goodbye Girl (1982 TBS edition)– Elliot Garfield
The Big Fix (TBS edition) – Moses Wine
The Buddy System (NTV edition) – Joe
Stand by Me (1989 Fuji TV edition) – The Writer
Stakeout (1994 NTV edition) – Det. Chris Lecce
Always (VHS,DVD and Blu-ray and 1995 NTV editions) – Pete Sandich
Let It Ride (VHS edition) – Jay Trotter
Once Around – Sam Sharpe
Another Stakeout (1998 NTV edition) – Det. Chris Lecce
Mr. Holland's Opus (1997 TV Asahi edition) – Glenn Holland
The Crew – Bobby Bartellemeo
Fail Safe – The President
My Life in Ruins – Irv Gideon
Squatters – David
Audrey – Robert Dreyfuss
Robert De Niro
Midnight Run – Jack Walsh
Cape Fear – Max Cady
Meet the Parents – Jack Tiberius Byrnes
Meet the Fockers – Jack Tiberius Byrnes
Stardust – Captain Shakespeare
Everybody's Fine – Frank Goode
Little Fockers – Jack Tiberius Byrnes
Killer Elite – Hunter
New Year's Eve – Stan Harris
Freelancers – Captain Joe Sarcone
The Big Wedding – Don Griffin
Killing Season – Benjamin Ford
The Bag Man – Dragna
Heist – Francis "The Pope" Silva
Hands of Stone – Ray Arcel
John Malkovich
In the Line of Fire (1996 TV Asahi edition) – Mitch Leary
Con Air (2000 TV Asahi edition) – Cyrus Grissom
Burn After Reading – Osbourne Cox
Red – Marvin Boggs
Secretariat – Lucien Laurin
Red 2 – Marvin Boggs
Warm Bodies – Colonel Grigio
Deepwater Horizon – Donald Vidrine
Unlocked – Bob Hunter
The New Pope – Pope John Paul III
Joe Pesci
Lethal Weapon 2 (1993 TV Asahi edition) – Leo Getz
Home Alone (1998 TV Asahi edition) – Harry Lime
Home Alone 2: Lost in New York (1996 TV Asahi edition) – Harry Lime
Lethal Weapon 3 (1995 TV Asahi edition) – Leo Getz
Casino – Nicholas "Nicky" Santoro
Lethal Weapon 4 (2001 NTV and 2003 TV Asahi editions) – Leo Getz
The Irishman – Russell Bufalino
Danny DeVito
Twins (1991 TV Asahi edition) – Vincent Benedict
Batman Returns – Oswald Cobblepot / Penguin
Jack the Bear – John Leary
Mars Attacks! – Rude Gambler
Matilda – Harry Wormwood
What's the Worst That Could Happen? – Max Fairbanks
Gary Busey
Bulletproof (1990 TV Asahi edition) – Frank McBain
Predator 2 (1994 TV Asahi edition) – Peter Keyes
Point Break – Angelo Pappas
Under Siege – Commander Krill
The Rage (TV Tokyo edition) – Art Dacy 
Robin Williams
Awakenings – Dr. Malcolm Sayer
Hook – Peter Banning/Peter Pan
Good Will Hunting – Sean Maguire
The Final Cut – Alan Hakman
The Butler (2016 BS Japan edition) – Dwight D. Eisenhower
48 Hrs. (1985 NTV edition) – Albert Ganz (James Remar)
The Adventures of Buckaroo Banzai Across the 8th Dimension – Dr. Emilio Lizardo  (John Lithgow)
Alien: The Director's Cut – Brett (Harry Dean Stanton)
Assault on Precinct 13 (1980 TV Tokyo edition) – Lieutenant Ethan Bishop (Austin Stoker)
Battlestar Galactica – Sire Uri (Ray Milland)
Beverly Hills Cop II – Maxwell Dent (Jürgen Prochnow)
Big Game – Herbert (Jim Broadbent)
The Big Lebowski (Blu-Ray edition) – Jeffrey "The Big" Lebowski (David Huddleston)
The Bodyguard – Mail Man (Yuen Wah)
The Boondock Saints II: All Saints Day – Louie "The Roman" / "The Old Man" (Peter Fonda)
Cool Runnings – Irving Blitzer (John Candy)
CSI: Cyber – D.B. Russell (Ted Danson)
The Empire Strikes Back (1980 Movie theater edition) - Lando Calrissian (Billy Dee Williams)
Daddy's Home 2 – Don Whitaker (John Lithgow)
Das Boot (1983 Fuji TV edition) – Chief Engineer (Klaus Wennemann)
Dinosaurs – Earl Sinclair (Stuart Pankin)
Doomsday – Marcus Kane (Malcolm McDowell)
Dune – Baron Vladimir Harkonnen (Kenneth McMillan)
Eraser (1999 NTV edition) – Johnny Casteleone (Robert Pastorelli)
Forrest Gump (1998 NTV edition) – Lieutenant Dan Taylor (Gary Sinise)
Getaway – Mysterious Voice (Jon Voight)
Ghost Ship – Captain Sean Murphy (Gabriel Byrne)
The Hard Way – Lieutenant John Moss (James Woods)
Hatfields & McCoys – Jim Vance (Tom Berenger)
The Haunted Mansion – Ezra (Wallace Shawn)
The Hitcher (1987 TV Tokyo edition) – John Ryder (Rutger Hauer)
Hobo with a Shotgun – Hobo (Rutger Hauer)
House of Gucci – Aldo Gucci (Al Pacino)
The Hudsucker Proxy – Sidney J. Mussburger (Paul Newman)
Iceman: The Time Traveller – Hojo Shogun (Yasuaki Kurata)
Insomnia – Will Dormer (Al Pacino)
Internal Affairs – Officer Dennis Peck (Richard Gere)
Kill Bill: Volume 2 – Johnny Mo (Gordon Liu)
Kung Fu Hustle – The Landlord of the Pig Sty Alley (Yuen Wah)
Marked for Death (1995 TV Asahi edition) – Screwface (Basil Wallace)
Master with Cracked Fingers – Old Master (Yuen Siu-tien)
The Matrix (2002 Fuji TV edition) – Cypher (Joe Pantoliano)
Million Dollar Baby – Frankie Dunn (Clint Eastwood)
Mission: Impossible – Eugene Kittridge (Henry Czerny)
The Monkey King – Dragon King of the East Sea (Liu Hua)
Natural Born Killers – Warden Dwight McClusky (Tommy Lee Jones)
The Passage – Captain Von Berkow (Malcolm McDowell)
Proud Mary – Benny (Danny Glover)
Raiders of the Lost Ark – Arnold Toht (Ronald Lacey)
Raising Cain – Dr. Carter Nix (John Lithgow)
Rambo: First Blood Part II (1993 Fuji TV edition) – Marshall Murdock (Charles Napier)
The Return of the Living Dead (1987 NTV edition) – Freddy (Thom Mathews)
Return of the Living Dead Part II (1989 NTV edition) – Joey (Thom Mathews)
Rogue One – Admiral Raddus
Saaho – Narantak Roy (Jackie Shroff)
Safe House – Harlan Whitford (Sam Shepard)
Scarface (1989 TV Asahi edition) – Tony Montana (Al Pacino)
Shooter – Colonel Isaac Johnson (Danny Glover)
Superman III (1985 TV Asahi edition) – August "Gus" Gorman (Richard Pryor)
Survivor – Bill Talbot (Robert Forster)
The Sweeney – Detective Inspector Jack Regan (Ray Winstone)
Taboo – Sir Stuart Strange (Jonathan Pryce)
Tai Chi 0 – Grand Uncle (Stanley Fung)
Tai Chi Hero – Grand Uncle (Stanley Fung)
Teenage Mutant Ninja Turtles: Out of the Shadows – Splinter
Total Recall (1992 TV Asahi edition) – Benny (Mel Johnson, Jr.)
True Lies – Salim Abu Aziz (Art Malik)
A Walk in the Woods – Stephen Katz (Nick Nolte)
The Young Master – Ah Suk (Fung Fung)

Animation
Cars – Ramone
Cars 2 – Ramone
Cars 3 – Ramone
Kung Fu Panda 3 – Master Shifu
The Lion King – Banzai
Toy Story 2 – Al McWhiggin
Trolls World Tour – King Thrash

References

External links
Seinenza profile 

1943 births
Japanese male film actors
Japanese male television actors
Japanese male video game actors
Japanese male voice actors
Living people
Male actors from Tokyo
20th-century Japanese male actors
21st-century Japanese male actors